Judy Darcy (born 1950) is a Canadian health care advocate, trade unionist, and former politician. Darcy was the first Minister of Mental Health and Addictions of British Columbia. She was the fourth National President of the Canadian Union of Public Employees from 1991 until 2003, making her the second woman and second Jewish-Canadian person to hold the post, and business manager of the Hospital Employees' Union from 2005 to 2011.

Darcy was elected to the Legislative Assembly of British Columbia in the 2013 election, as a BC NDP candidate for the provincial constituency of New Westminster.

Early life
Darcy was born Ida Maria Judith Borunsky in Denmark and came to Canada with her parents when she was 18 months old. Her father was a research chemist who was a shipping clerk for years until he could re-establish his credentials in Canada and resume work in his profession.

Her father, Jules (Youli) Simonovich Borunsky, was a Russian Jew whose family had moved to France following the Russian Revolution. Borunsky's first wife was a French Catholic woman. During the war he enlisted in the French Army and was taken prisoner during the Battle of Dunkirk. During his detention as a Prisoner of war, he survived and avoided deportation to a concentration camp by hiding his Jewishness and pretending to be a devout Catholic, including Catholic references and symbols in his letters to his wife as part of the ruse. With Paris occupied by the Nazis, Borunsky convinced his father that it would be safer for him to join the rest of the family in Kovno, Lithuania. However, four days after he arrived, the town was invaded by the Nazis. Einsatzgruppen murdered most of the Jewish population, presumably including Borunsky's father, sister, her husband and their daughter. According to Darcy, her father "carried tremendous guilt, [t]he guilt of having survived when others died and the guilt of having sent his father to his death." Borunsky's first wife died of illness around the end of the war. Borunsky, after being liberated, worked as deputy director of a United Nations Refugee Agency displaced persons camp where he met Else Margrethe Rich, a veteran of the Danish resistance movement who found work on the staff of the camp after the war. Traumatized by the war and the loss of his family, and afraid of further anti-Semitic oppression, Borunsky continued to hide his Jewishness from everyone except for his wife until later life.

Borunsky and Rich married and moved to Denmark where Darcy was born in 1950. Darcy and her sister and brother were all baptized in the Russian Orthodox Church but were not raised in any faith. The family emigrated to Canada in 1951, and settled in Sarnia where Borunsky found work in the  petrochemical industry. When she was 8, her parents changed the family's name to Darcy as her father wanted a French sounding name. After his retirement, her father started attending Holy Blossom Synagogue and the Bernard Betel Centre for Creative Living in order to rekindle his Jewish roots and gradually revealed his story to his children.

Darcy was raised in Sarnia, and moved to Toronto to study political science at York University but quit after 1½ years, but not before infiltrating and disrupting the Miss Canadian University Pageant yelling "It's true it's a meat market and they do exploit women!" as the winner was announced. After travelling and doing odd jobs, she became a University of Toronto library clerk in 1972 and became active in CUPE.

Union activism
In her youth, Darcy was active with the Workers' Communist Party of Canada, a Maoist group, and was a candidate for the party in the 1981 Ontario provincial election in the Toronto riding of St. Andrew—St. Patrick. By 1985, she had left the party and joined the New Democratic Party saying of her earlier radicalism ""I'm older, I don't think we're going to remake the world, but we've got to change what we can."

In 1983, she became a regional vice-president of the union's Ontario division and was also working at the Metropolitan Toronto Reference Library.

By the mid-1980s, she was president of the Metro Toronto Council of CUPE.

In 1986, she ran for the position of Ontario president of CUPE challenging 10-year incumbent Lucie Nicholson. She was unsuccessful, losing by a margin of 318-240, her defeat blamed on a red-baiting campaign by the union's leadership. Darcy, however, did manage to retain a spot on the union's executive board topping the slate of "member at large" positions.

By 1988, she was first vice-president of CUPE's Ontario division as well as a vice-president of the Ontario Federation of Labour. In 1989, she successfully ran for the position of national secretary-treasurer of CUPE, the union's number two position. saying that said she stands for strong leadership to help CUPE cope with "some of the incredibly difficult challenges we'll see in the next few years, especially in light of free trade."

In the 1988 federal election, Darcy was the NDP's candidate against Liberal Frank Stronach and Progressive Conservative John E. Cole in York—Simcoe placing a "distant third" in the suburban Toronto riding.

In 1991, she was elected CUPE national president taking over the 406,000 member trade union. By the time she retired 13 years later the union had grown to 525,000 members.

Electoral record

After CUPE
She moved to British Columbia subsequently and ran for the provincial British Columbia New Democratic Party nomination in Vancouver-Fairview but was upset by a businessman Gregor Robertson by a margin of 76 votes on the second ballot.

In February 2005, Darcy returned to work in the trade union movement acquiring a position as secretary-business manager and chief negotiator with British Columbia's Hospital Employees' Union. She was known as being on the left of the union and an advocate of issues such as employment equity and childcare. She resigned from this position in September 2011 in preparation for her candidacy in the 2013 BC provincial election in New Westminster. She celebrated her election as New Westminster's Member of the Legislative Assembly at the Heritage Grill. At this party, Darcy led attendees in chanting "NDP".

References

1950 births
20th-century Canadian women politicians
21st-century Canadian politicians
21st-century Canadian women politicians
Jewish Canadian politicians
British Columbia New Democratic Party MLAs
Canadian people of Russian-Jewish descent
Trade unionists from British Columbia
Canadian Union of Public Employees people
Candidates in Ontario provincial elections
Danish emigrants to Canada
Living people
Members of the Executive Council of British Columbia
New Democratic Party candidates for the Canadian House of Commons
Ontario candidates for Member of Parliament
University of Toronto people
Women government ministers of Canada
Women in Ontario politics
Women trade union leaders
Women MLAs in British Columbia
York University alumni
Canadian women trade unionists
Trade unionists from Ontario
Jewish women politicians
Workers' Communist Party (Canada) politicians